The Academy of Medical Educators (AoME) is a multi-professional body which is the standard setting body for clinical teachers in the United Kingdom. It was formed in 2006 and has developed recognised frameworks for educators.

Activities
The academy has stated aims which relate to the advancement of medical education for the public benefit. This includes developing a transparent career structure for specialist medical educators.

The academy funds some research, including gathering evidence in support of their policies.

History 
The academy was established in October 2006. It became the first professional organisation for medical educators which was designed to offer career support to members through a registerable qualification and professional accreditation. By January 2008, the academy had internal governance structures in place.

The academy published the first professional standards for medical educators in 2009. The standards were revised in 2012 and then again in 2015.
 
The General Medical Council (GMC) have adopted the AoME's "Framework for Supervisors" (2010), as the framework for the criteria which all trainers in recognised roles will be expected to provide evidence of their ongoing professional development against.

Membership
Members are entitled to use the post nominals MAcadMEd and fellows may use FAcadMEd.

Full membership can also be gained where individuals have gained certain educational qualifications from an institution that is accredited by AoME.

Some medical colleges have an arrangement where they are corporate partners with the academy.

List of presidents 
 2007–2011 Professor John Bligh
 2011–2014 Sean Hilton
 2014–2017 Derek Gallen
 2017- Jacky Hayden

Governance 
On 12 October 2006, the academy became a Company Limited by Guarantee with Companies' House (Company number 5965178). It registered as a charity with the Charity Commission for England and Wales on 2 April 2009.

The academy is governed by a Council of Trustees, who are also the Directors of the company. There are 18 members of Council (16 of whom are elected by the members of the academy) including Honorary Officers whose have roles in providing strategic advice.

References

External links
 

Learned societies of the United Kingdom
2006 establishments in the United Kingdom
Organizations established in 2006